Videira is a surname. Notable people with the surname include:

Amélia Videira (born 1945), Portuguese actor
Joaquim Videira (born 1984), Portuguese fencer
Michael Videira (born 1986), American soccer player
Patrick Videira (born 1977), French football manager

See also
Vieira